Peroxisomal NADH pyrophosphatase NUDT12 is an enzyme that in humans is encoded by the NUDT12 gene.

Nucleotides are involved in numerous biochemical reactions and pathways within the cell as substrates, cofactors, and effectors. 

Nudix hydrolases, such as NUDT12, regulate the concentrations of individual nucleotides and of nucleotide ratios in response to changing circumstances (Abdelraheim et al., 2003).[supplied by OMIM]

References

Further reading

Nudix hydrolases